{{infobox person
| name                =Okuyo Joel Atiku Prynce 
| image = Joel Okuyo (Right) in Nigeria.jpg
| caption             =Prince (right) and Agnes Kebirungi (left) from Battle of the Souls with Olu Jacobs (centre) in Nigeria
| birth_name          = Okuyo Joel Atiku Prynce
| alias               =
| relatives = 
| birth_date          = 
| birth_place         = Arua, Uganda
| module              =
| occupation = Actor, model, photographer and lecturer
| alma mater = Makerere University 
| partner =  Cindy Sanyu
}}Okuyo Joel Atiku Prynce' is a Ugandan actor, model, photographer and lecturer at Uganda Christian University where he graduated with a Bachelor of Social Work and Social Administration (BSWSA) plus Makerere University, the Best Two Campuses in Uganda. His film acting breakthrough came when he was cast as the Devil's reincarnation in Ugandan director Matt Bish's 2007 Film Battle of the Souls, a popular Ugawood Movie. It was based on the real-life story of the director's brother, KFM Radio Presenter Roger Mugisha. Prynce is also the President of his own company The Lhynnq-X, Inc. Born in Arua on 4 December 1983 to a Lugbara couple, the late Lt.Colonel Gabriel Francis Atiku and Yema Drakuru Atiku, his debut villain role won him over five international accolades including Best Supporting Actor at the Balafon Film Festival in Bari, Italy (2008) and 2009's Best Actor in Supporting Role at the African Movie Academy Awards (AMAA) in Lagos, Nigeria. Other awards include Best Actor at both Ubuntu Village, Colorado (USA) in 2010 and the 2011 Zanzibar International Film Festival [ZIFF] in Tanzania. Ugandan newspaper The Observer labelled Okuyo Africa's Brad Pitt.

Career
His mother recalls that Joel started acting by copying his father's walking style at age 4 plus things he watched on TV or saw at school. By Primary Five, he had won his first award and kept acting throughout his school experience. Okuyo also joined MITG (Music & Instrumental Training Group), an Arua-based Drama Group that championed European Union AIDS Intervention Programmes in West Nile. Joel has acted in many films and plays, both local and international plus worked with world class directors such as Michael Landon, Jr., Gabriel Range, Adrian McFarlane, Ruman Kudwai, Yuval Shefferman and fellow countryman Matt Bish (Full name: Matthew Bishanga). Joel played roles in feature films like State Research Bureau (S.R.B.) plus TV Series like Locked Up Abroad, Raised Wild and Lost in Africa.

The Maisha Film Lab short films he acted in after training at Mira Nair's annual film academy include On Time (2008) directed by Patricia Olwoch, Looserpool, Live Joseph and Estranged (where he played a lead role) directed by Sandra Kosse.

Other shorts he has featured in include Fruits of Love, Journey to Jamaa as Lucky, Haunted Souls and A Good Catholic Girl directed by Matt Bish (which was included in Africa First: Volume Two, an anthology of five short films from new African filmmakers).

He was the face of BlackBerry Curve (MTN Uganda) in 2007. Then in 2009, he became a runway model at V.I.P fashion night in Lagos, Nigeria. He has worked as a model at Vanity Models (Verona, Italy) and Uganda's Gorgeous Fashions. Joel's face also appears in SAB Miller Television, Billboard & Print Media advertisements for beer brands such as Stone Lager in Ghana, Safari Lager in Tanzania and Nile Special Lager in his home country, all directed by Mark Lawrie for The Videolounge. Other TV commercials include Warid Telecom (Congo Brazzaville) directed by Steve Jean; Warid (Uganda), Stanbic Bank and Johns Hopkins University directed by Carolyn Kamya plus Bank of Uganda directed by Matt Bish.

He was the first male to appear in the African Woman Magazines 'All Lights On' Segment in 2010.

Joel appeared in the promo for Love Makanika (TV series), one of the first programmes aired on Pearl Magic that went digital on GOtv beginning Monday 1 October 2018.

Radio
Okuyo has lent his talent as a supporting voice to radio productions like Mako Meere directed by Patricia Olwoch (for Mifumi) and Rock Point by Albert Mwesige (Audio Central). He once worked for Bob FM also.

Theatre
He has acted in theatre performances like Just You Me & the Silence directed by Judith Adong in conjunction with Alfajiri Productions. In 2017, he took part as Lokil in preparing a stage play entitled Strings that will first be performed on 22 November.

Controversial performance
Okuyo received negative criticism, even from friends for acting in The River and the Mountain, a play whose parts Uganda's Media Council ruled "implicitly promote homosexual acts". Written by Oxford-educated poet Beau Hopkins in collaboration with David Cecil, a British producer and the manager of Tilapia (Cultural Centre where the play ran for a week until 23 August 2012), it was deemed contrary to the laws, cultural norms and values of Uganda hence Cecil's arrest on 6 September 2012. In the play, Okuyo plays Samson, a homosexual factory owner killed by his own workers after they are incited by fiercely conservative pastors. Okuyo was accused of "being funded by gay lobby groups", but replied, "I am not into gay advocacy.' Although with this play, we do want to make people understand that we are all human. We should not judge, segregate, harm or kill others."

Personal interests
Joel enjoys drawing (Art), fashion, film acting, modelling, meeting new friends, humanitarianism, playing basketball, guitar, swimming, fishing, reading, cooking, writing and travelling. In March 2020, he got engaged to dancehall artiste Cindy Sanyu with whom he had worked on two films November Tear and Bella.

Filmography
 Music videos
Okuyo features in Priscilla Kalibala's "Boo", the original soundtrack to Battle of the Souls plus "Free People" written and performed by Terry De Vos as the original soundtrack to State Research Bureau''. He also features in Winnie Nwagi's "Kibulamu" music video as her lover. The singer tells him that their relationship lacks certain romantic things, so they need to go their separate ways. Winnie even packs her bag to leave. In the end, they reconcile but while sitting at a table, two packs of condoms fall from Okuyo's coat and the video fades. He also features in "Ready To Leave" by Abasa. Prynce through his production company has made music videos for artistes like Cindy including "Whine Yo Waist", "Sunset" and "Kiki", etc.

 Films

 Television

References

External links
Uganda: Country's Leading Man
Official website

Best Supporting Actor Africa Movie Academy Award winners
Living people
Uganda Christian University alumni
Ugandan male film actors
Ugandan male models
Ugandan male stage actors
Academic staff of Uganda Christian University
21st-century Ugandan male actors
1983 births